The 1930–31 season was the 22nd in the history of the Isthmian League, an English football competition.

Wimbledon were champions, winning their first Isthmian League title.

League table

References

Isthmian League seasons
I